Loral may refer to:

 Loral Corporation, contractor founded in 1948 in New York by William Lorenz and Leon Alpert as Loral Electronics Corporation
 Loral Space & Communications, satellite communications company
 Loral GZ-22, a non-rigid airship
 Loral 1300, a satellite bus
 5225 Loral, minor planet
 Loral Langemeier, an American writer on finance
 Loral O'Hara, a NASA astronaut candidate of the class of 2017
 the adjective form of Lore (anatomy)

See also 
 Laurel (plant), an evergreen shrub whose sap, leaves, and fruit are highly-poisonous to humans, livestock, dogs, and other animals.